Have His Carcase is a 1932 locked-room mystery by Dorothy L. Sayers, her seventh novel featuring Lord Peter Wimsey and the second in which Harriet Vane appears.

Plot
During a hiking holiday on the South West coast of England, the detective novelist Harriet Vane discovers the body of a man lying on an isolated rock on the shore, not far from the resort of Wilvercombe; his throat has been cut. Harriet takes photographs and collects the razor used in the death. The man's blood is still liquid, a fact which later leads to the assumption he had died shortly before she arrived. There are no footprints in the sand other than hers and those of the victim. Unfortunately, the corpse is washed away by the rising tide before she can summon help.

Alerted to the discovery by a friend, Lord Peter Wimsey arrives, and he and Harriet start their investigations. The victim is identified as Paul Alexis, a young man of Russian extraction, employed by a Wilvercombe hotel as a professional dancing partner. The police tend to the view that Alexis's death was suicide and that he had cut his own throat.

Wimsey and Harriet discover that in the period leading up to his death Alexis, an avid reader of Ruritanian romances, had believed himself to be a descendant of Tsar Nicholas I of Russia. A series of cipher letters received from an unknown source convinced him that he was being called to return to Russia to take his place as the new rightful Tsar.

Alexis had been engaged to a rich widow in her fifties, Mrs Weldon. Her son, Henry Weldon, ten years older than his mother's lover and by all appearances a simple and brutish man, is appalled at the prospect of his mother's remarriage to a gigolo, and at his potential loss of inheritance. He travels to Wilvercombe to monitor the investigation while ostensibly comforting his mother after her loss. Weldon appears to be a likely murder suspect, but he has an unshakeable alibi for the time of Alexis's death – as do a large number of other possible suspects.

Alexis's death, staged to look like suicide, is gradually revealed to be the result of an ingenious murder plot that played upon Alexis's fantasies. He had been lured to the rock by his anonymous correspondent who urged him to be ready to meet a 'Rider from the Sea', a rider who it was said would be carrying instructions for his onward journey to Warsaw.  Once at the rock, Alexis met his death at the hand of the murderer who had ridden his horse along the beach through the incoming tide to avoid leaving tracks.

Wimsey and Harriet ultimately realise that Weldon is not the simple character he has been presenting, but a criminal who has been living under two different identities. Weldon was himself the rider, and had been provided with his alibi by two co-conspirators, a friend and his wife. Although his alibi was secure for the believed time of death, the investigators discover that Alexis had died far earlier than had been thought. The still-liquid and unclotted blood noted by Harriet when she found the body had been the result of Alexis's haemophilia. Weldon and his co-conspirators are undone by their unsuccessful attempts to reshuffle their alibis to match the new information about the time of death.

Even as Wimsey and Harriet solve the case, Mrs Weldon has already moved on to another gigolo at the hotel, a sympathetic French dancer named Antoine.

Title
The novel's title appears in William Cowper's translation of Book II of Homer's Iliad: "The vulture's maw / Shall have his carcase, and the dogs his bones". The phrase  also appears a number of times in The Pickwick Papers by Charles Dickens, as Sam Weller's distortion of the legal term habeas corpus.

Characters
Lord Peter Wimsey: protagonist, aristocratic amateur detective
Miss Harriet Vane: protagonist, detective novelist with whom Wimsey is in love
Paul Alexis (deceased): professional dancing partner at a hotel
Mrs Weldon: elderly wealthy widow, engaged to Alexis
Henry Weldon: only son of Mrs Weldon
Haviland Martin: suspicious camper who proves hard to trace
Bright: itinerant hairdresser with a cloudy past
Mr Alfred Morecambe: London commission agent
Mrs Morecambe: actress, wife of Alfred
Inspector Umpelty: local policeman in charge of the investigation
Mervyn Bunter: Lord Peter's gentleman

Chapter heads
All the chapter heads feature quotations from the works of the dramatist and poet Thomas Lovell Beddoes.

Criticism
In their overview A Catalogue of Crime (1971/89) Barzun & Taylor noted that the book was "A great achievement, despite some critics' carping. The people, the motive, the cipher, and the detection are all topnotch. Here, too, is the first (and definitive) use of hemophilia as a misleading fact. And surely the son, the mother, and her self-deluded gigolo are definitive types".

Adaptations
The novel was adapted for radio in 1981 for BBC Radio 4 by Alistair Beaton, starring Ian Carmichael as Lord Peter and Maria Aitken as Harriet Vane.

It was adapted for television in 1987, as part of a series starring Edward Petherbridge as Lord Peter and Harriet Walter as Harriet Vane.  In this version, Mervyn Bunter is played by Richard Morant, the brother of Angela Morant who portrays the character Mrs Morecambe.

References

External links
 

1932 British novels
British mystery novels
Novels by Dorothy L. Sayers
Novels set in the 1930s
Locked-room mysteries
Victor Gollancz Ltd books
British novels adapted into television shows